The Old Mount Dora A. C. L. Railroad Station (also known as the Mount Dora Chamber of Commerce) is a historic Atlantic Coast Line Railroad (ACL) depot in Mount Dora, Florida. It is located at 341 North Alexander Street. It was built by ACL in 1915, replacing an earlier depot built in 1895 when the line was part of the Plant System. The station's design, which includes elements of the Queen Anne and Romanesque Revival styles, is similar to other ACL stations of the era. The line was mainly used to ship citrus fruit and other agricultural products, though its passenger trains also brought tourists to the city. Passenger service ended in 1949, and the Mount Dora Chamber of Commerce bought the station in 1981. On March 5, 1992, the station was added to the U.S. National Register of Historic Places.

References

External links

 Lake County listings at National Register of Historic Places
 Florida's Office of Cultural and Historical Programs
 Lake County listings
 Mount Dora Chamber of Commerce

Railway stations on the National Register of Historic Places in Florida
Atlantic Coast Line Railroad stations
Mount Dora
National Register of Historic Places in Lake County, Florida
Transportation buildings and structures in Lake County, Florida
Railway stations in the United States opened in 1915
Mount Dora, Florida
1915 establishments in Florida
Railway stations closed in 1950